Trondhjems Skøiteklub is a Norwegian sports club from Trondheim, founded in 1876. It has sections for figure skating and speed skating.

Former members include Peder Østlund, Edvard Engelsaas, Oluf Steen, Astri Mæhre Johannessen, Martin Sæterhaug, Ivar Ballangrud, Magne Thomassen and Rolf Falk-Larssen.

References
Official site 

Speed skating clubs in Norway
Sports clubs established in 1876
Sport in Trondheim
1876 establishments in Norway
Figure skating clubs in Norway